Ndwedwe Local Municipality is an administrative area in the iLembe District of KwaZulu-Natal in South Africa.

Primary kaolin deposits occur in Ndwedwe. Good quality material is found near Coqweni, Nozandla and Appelsbosch.

Towns in the municipality include Ndwedwe, Glendale Heights.

Main places
The 2001 census divided the municipality into the following main places:

Politics 

The municipal council consists of thirty-seven members elected by mixed-member proportional representation. Nineteen councillors are elected by first-past-the-post voting in nineteen wards, while the remaining eighteen are chosen from party lists so that the total number of party representatives is proportional to the number of votes received. In the election of 1 November 2021 the African National Congress (ANC) won a reduced majority of nineteen seats on the council.

The following table shows the results of the election.

References

External links
 Official website

Local municipalities of the iLembe District Municipality
Ndwedwe Local Municipality